Memorandum is the third album by the German band Lacrimas Profundere.

Track listing

Personnel
Christopher Schmid: Vocals 
Anja Hotzendorfer: Violin and Female Vocals
Oliver Nikolas Schmid: Lead-, classic and acoustic guitar
Marco Praschberger: Rhythm guitars 
Markus Lapper: Bass
Ursula Schmidhammer: Harp
Christian Steiner: Keyboards
Lorenz Gehmacher: Drums

External links
Metal Storm album review 
Encyclopaedia Metallum fan reviews 
Vampster album review 

1999 albums
Lacrimas Profundere albums
Napalm Records albums